Elethyia is a genus of moths of the family Crambidae.

Species
Elethyia albirufalis (Hampson, 1919)
Elethyia minerva (Błeszyński, 1965)
Elethyia subscissa (Christoph, 1877)
Elethyia taishanensis (Caradja & Meyrick, 1937)

References

Ancylolomiini
Crambidae genera
Taxa named by Émile Louis Ragonot